Matthew Coffin Butterick (born November 15, 1970) is an American typographer, lawyer, writer, and computer programmer. He received the 2012 Golden Pen Award from the Legal Writing Institute for his book Typography for Lawyers, which started as a website in 2008 based on his experience as a practicing attorney. He has worked for The Font Bureau and founded his own website design company, Atomic Vision (purchased by Red Hat in 1999). Expanding Typography for Lawyers, Butterick published Practical Typography as a "web-based book" in July 2013.

Butterick graduated with a BA in visual and environmental studies from Harvard University. He later earned a JD at the University of California, Los Angeles and was admitted to the State Bar of California in 2007.

As of January 2023, Butterick is currently serving as co-counsel in multiple class action lawsuits against AI companies Github Copilot, Stable Diffusion, as well as another class action lawsuit against Stability AI, Midjourney, and DeviantArt.

Typefaces

Butterick's typeface designs include:

For Font Bureau
 Wessex (1993), transitional text serif inspired by Bulmer and Caledonia
 Herald Gothic (1993), a bevelled sans-serif
 Berlin Sans (1994, part), a flared sans-serif
 Hermes (1995), a blocky sans-serif loosely inspired by Berthold Block
 Alix, a typewriter font

Self-released

 Equity, an updating of the 1930s body text serif design Ehrhardt. Features grades designed to suit different types of paper and printers, and separate small caps fonts intended for use in Word.
 Concourse, loosely inspired by Dwiggins’ geometric sans-serif design Metro. Features stylistic alternates and small caps.
 Triplicate, a monospaced slab serif design inspired by typewriter fonts such as the default face used in the IBM Selectric. Essentially a further development of Alix, with more variants including a proportional version and a style designed specifically for displaying code.
 Advocate, a caps-only slab and sans serif design. Reminiscent of mid-century American college sports team lettering, corporate logos and Bank Gothic. Somewhat resembles an expansion of Herald Gothic.
Heliotrope, an attempt to merge the characteristics of serif and sans serif fonts into a single typeface. It draws loose inspiration from typefaces such as Optima and Albertus.

References

External links
Butterick's Practical Typography website
Equity
Concourse

Lawyers from Los Angeles
American typographers and type designers
American instructional writers
21st-century American non-fiction writers
American male non-fiction writers
Living people
Harvard University alumni
UCLA School of Law alumni
People from Ann Arbor, Michigan
1970 births
21st-century American male writers